Jobez is a surname. Notable people with the surname include:

 Alphonse Jobez (1813–1893), French businessman and politician
 Henri-Jean Jobez (1865–1931), French politician
 Jean-Emmanuel Jobez (1775–1828), French businessman and politician
 Jean Jobez (born 1943), French cross-country skier

See also
Jabez